Andhra Pradesh has the 2nd longest coastline of 974 km in the eastern peninsular India, which accounts for 12% of the country's total coastline with one major (Operational) and 14 non–major (5 Operational) ports, with six ports under development in the PPP mode.

Cargo handling 

The state's ports handled 73 million tons of cargo in financial year 2015–16. The state of Andhra Pradesh is the second maritime state (after Gujarat) in terms of cargo handled by Non-Major Ports and the third maritime state (after Gujarat and Maharashtra) in terms of overall cargo handled including Visakhapatnam port trust .

Exports and imports 

Exported products are Rice, Wheat, Maize, Soya bean meal and retraction, Rice bran extraction, Bentonite, Fibre, Fish Meal, Tobacco, Sand, Cement Iron ore, Cement clinker, Minerals  etc. Some of the imports include Murate of Potash, Rock phosphate, Urea, Crude Palm Oil, Edible oils, Chemicals, Gases, Wood pulp, Machineries etc. Lightering of Crude oil also takes place.

Ports and harbours

References

 
ports and harbours
Andhra Pradesh